This is a list of the tournaments played in the 2005 season of Men's tennis (calendar year), including ATP events and ITF events (This does not include the ITF Men's Circuit, only the ATP circuit).

Changes 
The third set of doubles matches was no longer played as a traditional set. Instead it was played as a match tie break first to 10 and clear by 2, to decide the winner.

Calendar 
Key

January

February

March

April

May

June

July

August

September

October

November

Statistics 

 Number of tournaments played on hardcourts: 30 (2 Grand Slams)
 Number of tournaments played on clay: 24 (1 Grand Slam)
 Number of tournaments played on grass: 6 (1 Grand Slam)
 Number of tournaments played on carpet: 7

Entry rankings 

Note: Mariano Puerta received a ranking penalty at the end of the 2005 season. His ranking dropped from 13 to 56.

Notable breakthrough players 
The 2005 season saw the debut of future world No. 1 Novak Djokovic into the main ATP Tour. Ranked world no. 186 at the beginning of the year, he qualified for the Australian Open but was defeated heavily in the first round by the eventual champion Marat Safin. He then recorded his first Grand Slam match victory at the French Open, defeating Robby Ginepri in the first round, before losing to Guillermo Coria in the second. He then reached the third round at both Wimbledon and the US Open, losing to Sébastien Grosjean and Fernando Verdasco, respectively. Djokovic would finish 2005 ranked world no. 78.

Future world No. 1 Andy Murray also made his breakthrough into the ATP Tour in 2005. Murray began the season ranked world No. 407 and was still participating in the junior tour, where he reached the semifinals of the French Open but lost to eventual champion Marin Čilić. He was awarded a wildcard into the main draw at Wimbledon, where he defeated George Bastl in the first round, and fourteenth seed Radek Štěpánek in the second, before losing to former finalist David Nalbandian in the third, despite having gone two sets to love up. He reached his first ATP Tour level final in October, at the 2005 Thailand Open as a wildcard, losing to Roger Federer; his run saw him enter the ATP's Top 100 for the first time. He eventually finished the season ranked world No. 63.

Retirements 
Following is a list of notable players (winners of a main tour title, and/or part of the ATP rankings top 100 (singles) or top 50 (doubles) for at least one week) who announced their retirement from professional tennis, became inactive (after not playing for more than 52 weeks), or were permanently banned from playing, during the 2002 season:

  Àlex Corretja (born 11 April 1974 in Barcelona, Spain) He turned professional in 1991 and finished runner-up twice at the French Open (in 1998 and 2001). He won the ATP Tour World Championships in 1998 and reached his career-high singles ranking of world no. 2 in 1999. He also played a key role in helping Spain win its first-ever Davis Cup title in 2000. He played his last match in Estoril against Feliciano López in April.
  Wayne Ferreira (born 15 September 1971 in Johannesburg, South Africa) He turned professional in 1989 and reached a career-high ranking of world no. 6 in 1995. He was a semifinalist twice at the Australian Open and a quarterfinalist at Wimbledon and the US Open. He earned 15 career singles titles. In doubles, he was ranked world no. 9 and earned 11 titles. He also won a silver medal at the 1992 Olympics. He played his last career match in Davis Cup competition in March.
  Richard Fromberg (born 28 April 1970 in Ulverstone, Australia) He turned professional in 1988 and reached his career-high ranking of world no. 24 in 1990. He earned four career ATP titles. He played his last career ATP match in doubles in Canberra in April partnering Chris Guccione.
  Karol Kučera (born March 4, 1974, in Bratislava, Czechoslovakia, now Slovakia) He turned professional in 1992 and reached a career-high ranking of world no. 6 in 1998. He was a semifinalist at the Australian Open and a quarterfinalist at the US Open in 1998. He earned six career ATP titles. He played his last
  Jared Palmer (born 2 July 1971 in New York City, New York) He turned professional in 1991 and reached his career-high singles ranking of world no. 35 in 1994. He earned one career ATP title. In doubles, he was ranked world no. 1 and won the Australian Open in 1995 and Wimbledon in 2001. He was also a finalist at the US Open in 2001 and a semifinalist at the French Open in 1996. His last career ATP match was at the US Open partnering Travis Parrott.
  Marc Rosset (born 7 November 1970 in Geneva, Switzerland) He turned professional in 1988 and reached his career-high ranking of world no. 9 in 1995. He was a semifinalist at the French Open in 1996 and a quarterfinalist at the Australian Open in 1999. He won the gold medal at the Olympics in 1992 and earned 15 career ATP titles. In doubles, he won eight titles and had a career-high ranking of world no. 8 in 1992. His last career match was in Lübeck in February against Dieter Kindlmann.
  Franco Squillari (born 22 August 1975 in Buenos Aires, Argentina) He turned professional in 1994 and reached a career-high ranking of world no. 11. He was a semifinalist at the French Open in 2000 and earned three career ATP titles. He played his last career match in Quito in October against Pablo Cuevas.
  Todd Woodbridge (born 2 April 1971 in Sydney, Australia) He turned professional in 1988 and reached a career-high singles ranking of world no. 19 and a doubles ranking of world no. 1. He won men's doubles at the Australian Open three times (1992, 1997, and 2001), at the French Open once (2000), Wimbledon nine times (1993, 1994, 1995, 1996, 1997, 2000, 2002, 2003, and 2004), the US Open twice (1992 and 1996) and the year-end tour finals twice (1992 and 1996). He won a gold medal at the 1996 Olympics and a silver at the 2000 Olympics. He also won seven mixed doubles Grand Slam titles: Australia in 1993, French in 1992 and 1995, Wimbledon in 1994, and the US Open in 1990, 1993, and 2001. He played his last doubles match at Wimbledon, partnering Mahesh Bhupathi.

See also 
 2005 WTA Tour

References 

 
ATP Tour
ATP Tour seasons